Breitungen (official name: Breitungen/Werra) is a municipality in the Schmalkalden-Meiningen district, Thuringia, Germany. It is situated on the river Werra, southeast of Bad Salzungen.

References

Schmalkalden-Meiningen